Bohdan Mykhaylovych Kobzar (born 22 April 2002) is a Ukrainian professional footballer who plays as a centre-forward for Ukrainian club FC Oleksandriya.

References

External links
 Profile on Volyn Lutsk official website
 

2002 births
Living people
People from Volyn Oblast
Ukrainian footballers
Association football forwards
FC Volyn Lutsk players
FC Oleksandriya players
Ukrainian Premier League players
Ukrainian First League players
Ukrainian Second League players